Seal Cove may refer to:

 Battle of Seal Cove, a minor naval action west of Lively Island during the 1982 Falklands war
 Seal Cove (Conception Bay South), Newfoundland and Labrador, Canada
 Seal Cove (Fortune Bay), Newfoundland and Labrador, Canada
 Seal Cove (White Bay), Newfoundland and Labrador, Canada
 Seal Cove Elementary School, a public elementary school in Prince Rupert, British Columbia
 Seal Cove, Maine, a village on Mount Desert Island off the coast of the U.S. state of Maine
 Prince Rupert/Seal Cove Water Aerodrome, Canada